Zhansugirov (romanized: Jansügırov) is a village in Aksu District, Almaty Region, Kazakhstan. It's the administrative center of the district. The population as of the 2009 Census was 8,288. 

The town was named after one of the leading names in Kazakh literature, Ilyas Zhansugurov.

Economy 
The town has a sugar processing plant, that makes up most of its economy.

References

Populated places in Almaty Region